Lessing-Othmer is a romanization of Mandarin Chinese that was introduced by F. Lessing and Dr. W. Othmer, who in 1912 printed their book „Lehrgang der nordchinesischen Umgangssprache“ („Course in the North Chinese Colloquial Language“) through the „Deutsch-Chinesische Druckerei und Verlagsanstalt“ in Tsingtau while it was a German colony.

In 1979, the State Council of the People's Republic of China for Romanization ruled that translations of foreign-language publications should utilize Lessing-Othmer romanization in German-speaking countries, and Pinyin in English-speaking countries.

Table 
The tones romanized differently from Pinyin are highlighted in blue.

Initial

Finals

References

Romanization of Chinese